Croll Glacier is a tributary glacier flowing southeast along the north side of Handler Ridge into Trafalgar Glacier, in the Victory Mountains, Victoria Land. It was named by the northern party of the New Zealand Federated Mountain Clubs Antarctic Expedition (NZFMCAE), 1962–63, for W.G. Croll, a member of the survey party attached to this expedition.

References
 

Glaciers of Victoria Land
Borchgrevink Coast